Carterton may refer to:

England
 Carterton, Oxfordshire, England
 Carterton F.C.
 Carterton Community College
 Carterton (Oxfordshire) railway station

New Zealand
 Carterton, New Zealand
 Carterton railway station
 Mayor of Carterton

See also
 Carter (disambiguation)
 Carterville (disambiguation)
 Cartersville
 Cartersburg